Joseph Rogers House may refer to:

 Joseph Hale Rogers House, Lexington, Kentucky, listed on the NRHP in Fayette County, Kentucky
 Joseph Rogers House (Newport, Rhode Island), listed on the NRHP in Rhode Island

See also
Rogers House (disambiguation)